Historias de un Amor (English: Stories of a love) is the 13th studio album by Mexican pop singer Mijares. This album was released on 19 September 2000 and it was produces by Danilo Ballo and Emanuele Ruffinengo. It has songs from songwriters like Alejandro Lerner, Ana Cirré, Zucchero and some Italian songs covered by the same Mijares.

Track listing
Tracks[]:
 Aunque No Estés - 4:43
 Si Me Enamoro
 Historia de un Amor
 ¿Por Culpa de Quién?
 La Belleza
 Amigas-Amores
 Dame Una Flor
 Perdóname
 Dile Que la Amas
 Háblame de Ti
 Cuando Te Hablo de Amor
 Cuando Me Vaya

Singles
 Aunque No Estés
 Si me enamoro
 Dame una flor

References

2000 albums
Manuel Mijares albums